Bicyclus lamani is a butterfly in the family Nymphalidae. It is found in Gabon, northern Angola and the Democratic Republic of the Congo. The habitat consists of open grassy woodland at altitudes between 700 and 1,500 meters.

References

Elymniini
Butterflies described in 1900
Butterflies of Africa
Taxa named by Per Olof Christopher Aurivillius